Emil Hermann Bose (October 20, 1874 in Bremen, Germany – May 25, 1911 in La Plata, Argentina), was a German physicist. He was the first director of the Department of Electrical Engineering at the University of La Plata, Argentina. He studied under Walther Nernst at the University of Göttingen, Germany and was recruited by the newly created university in Argentina, where he taught for two years until his death from typhoid fever in 1911. He was succeeded by Richard Gans.
See 
Bibiloni, A.G. (2005)

References 

Argentine physicists
20th-century  German physicists
1911 deaths
1874 births
Burials at La Plata Cemetery
Expatriates from the German Empire in Argentina